The Kaliningrad Puppet Theatre is a puppet theatre in Kaliningrad, Russia. The building was originally the Königin-Luise-Gedächtniskirche (Queen Louise Memorial Church), popularly known as the Luisenkirche,  a Protestant church in Königsberg, Germany.

History
The Luisenkirche, the first church to be built outside the Königsberg city walls, was named in honour of Queen Louise of Prussia (1776–1810), who was beloved by Königsbergers. Land and funds were donated primarily by the leading tobacco manufacturer Louis Großkopf and his wife, with additional funding coming from the banker and philanthropist Walter Simon, the industrialist Fritz Heumann, and A. Siebert.

The Neo-Romanesque building was designed by the architects Friedrich Heitmann and Franz Krah to serve the residential suburbs of Amalienau, Mittelhufen, and Vorderhufen. Constructed in Amalienau between 1899 and 1901 and dedicated on 9 September 1901, the church was heavily damaged during World War II.

Königsberg became the Soviet city of Kaliningrad after the war, and the Soviet authorities planned to demolish the ruins in the 1960s. However, the architect Yuri Vaganov convinced officials that the building could be converted into a puppet theatre. Renovations were completed in 1976. While the exterior of the building has largely retained its pre-war appearance, the interior has been redesigned to fit the needs of a theatre.

Gallery

References

1976 establishments in the Soviet Union
Puppet
Theatres completed in 1976
Puppet theaters
Romanesque Revival church buildings in Germany
Theatres in Russia
Tourist attractions in Kaliningrad Oblast
Churches completed in 1901
Cultural heritage monuments of regional significance in Kaliningrad Oblast